Kolding cog or Koldingkoggen is a shipwreck that was found in Kolding Fjord in 1943. The ship was a ca. 18 m long cog built of oak around the year 1190. The wreck was examined by the National Museum of Denmark in 2001. The study discovered that Kolding cog had a stern rudder thus making it the oldest known ship to have one.

See also
Bremen cog

Shipwrecks of Denmark
Archaeological discoveries in Denmark